The Admiralty Research Laboratory (ARL) was a research laboratory that supported the work of the UK Admiralty in Teddington, London, England from 1921 to 1977.

History
During the First World War, the Anti-Submarine Division of the Admiralty had established experimental stations at Hawkcraig (Aberdour) and Parkeston Quay, Harwich, with out-stations at Dartmouth and Wemyss Bay, to work on submarine detection methods. The Admiralty also established an experimental station at Shandon, Dumbartonshire, working with the Lancashire Anti-Submarine Committee and the Clyde Anti-Submarine Committee, which subsequently moved to Teddington in 1921, becoming the Admiralty Research Laboratory.

Its main fields of research expanded to include oceanography (it housed the National Institute of Oceanography, 1949–1953); electromagnetics and degaussing; underwater ballistics; visual aids; acoustics; infra-red radiation; photography and assessment techniques. It moved to Teddington, southwest of London, so that it could benefit from the expertise of the National Physical Laboratory.

Notable employees
Notable people who worked at the ARL included:

 Francis Crick (from 1940–1947) who helped to design magnetic and acoustic mines
 Martin Beale (from 1951–1960) who developed techniques for mathematical optimisation
 Edward Lee
 Jack Good (1959–1962)
 R. V. Jones (1938–1939)
 Charles Drysdale (superintendent 1921–1929)
 Cyril Hilsum (1947–1950)
 Alister Watson (1940s–1965), suspected Soviet spy.
 Peter Wright during the Second World War; as a degaussing specialist)
 Albert Beaumont Wood

Notes and references

External links

 

Admiralty departments
Research institutes in London
Military research establishments of the United Kingdom
Military history of Middlesex
Military history of London
Ministry of Defence Navy Department